John James Duncan Jr. (born July 21, 1947) is an American politician who served as the U.S. representative for  from 1988 to 2019. A lawyer, former judge, and former long serving member of the Army National Guard, he is a member of the Republican Party.

Early life, education, and legal career
Duncan was born in Lebanon, Tennessee. His "paternal grandparents were small-acreage farmers in Scott County, which in 1861 left Tennessee, refusing to follow the Volunteer State into the Confederacy, and declared itself 'the Free and Independent state of Scott.'" Duncan's parents were Lois (Swisher) and John Duncan Sr., who "hitchhiked into Knoxville with five dollars in his pocket,' and after an education at the University of Tennessee was elected mayor of Knoxville and then congressman." The elder Duncan was also a co-owner of the Knoxville Smokies of the "Sally League," for which his son "was a batboy, a ball shagger, scoreboard operator, and, as a freshman at the University of Tennessee, the Smokies' public-address announcer." Duncan also worked as a grocery bagger and salesman at Sears while working his way through school. Duncan supported Barry Goldwater's 1964 presidential campaign, and sent the first paycheck he earned as a bagboy at the local A&P to the Goldwater campaign.

Duncan graduated from the University of Tennessee at Knoxville in 1969 with a Bachelor of Journalism degree and subsequently received a Juris Doctor degree from George Washington University Law School in Washington, D.C. in 1973 and was admitted to the bar that same year. He also served in the Army National Guard from 1970 to 1987. He was an attorney in private practice until he became a state court judge in Knox County, Tennessee, where he served from 1981 to 1988.

U.S. House of Representatives

Elections
John Sr., who had represented the Knoxville-based 2nd District since 1965, died in June 1988. Jimmy Duncan won the Republican nomination to succeed him. He ran in and won two elections on November 8, 1988–a special election for the balance of his father's 12th term, and a regular election for a full two-year term. He was re-elected every two years from then until his retirement from a district that had been held continuously by Republicans (or their antecedents) since 1859, and by a Duncan since his father was first elected in 1964. He never faced a serious or well-funded challenge for reelection, and was reelected without major-party opposition in four consecutive elections (1994 through 2000). On the occasions he did face major-party opposition, he only dropped below 70 percent of the vote twice, during the special and regular elections in 1988. Indeed, the 1988 contests were the only times since the elder Duncan's first run that a Democrat has managed as much as 40 percent of the vote in this district.

Tenure
 

Duncan voted against authorizing the 2003 War in Iraq based on opposition to what he believed to be an unnecessary foreign involvement. He also opposed and voted against a June 2006 House declaration in support of the war. He was one of the most conservative Republicans to do so. Duncan later remarked that the Iraq War vote had been

Duncan was among only six Republicans to vote against funding for the Iraq War on May 24, 2007. Duncan voted, along with three other Republicans, to withdraw U.S. troops from Iraq by April 2008 on July 12, 2007.

On March 10, 2010, Duncan again joined three other Republicans in voting for the removal of troops from Afghanistan. Duncan and Ron Paul were the only members of Congress to vote for the removal of troops from Afghanistan and against all recent bailout and stimulus bills.

He has criticized neoconservatism and supports a non-interventionist foreign policy.

Duncan was a member of the Liberty Caucus, a group of libertarian-minded congressional Republicans.  Other members included Walter B. Jones of North Carolina, Roscoe Bartlett of Maryland, Scott Garrett of New Jersey, and Jeff Flake of Arizona. A former neighbor of his district, Zach Wamp of the 3rd district, also belonged to the group during his tenure in the House.

Duncan voted against the Wall Street bailout. In a column he explained his vote stating he "thought it would be better in the long run not to adopt the socialist approach." The American Conservative Union gave Duncan a 96% score for his voting record in 2013, higher than any other federal Representative in Congress from Tennessee.

The Family Research Council has rated Duncan as a 92% or above since 2002 and the NRA has rated him in equally positive terms. In 2012, Duncan received the number one spot in the 435-member House in the National Taxpayers Union's (NTU) annual ranking of Congress, earning him the "Taxpayer Hero" award.

Duncan is a frequent contributor to Chronicles and The American Conservative, both magazines associated with the paleoconservative movement.  He has also contributed to numerous trade publications and Capitol Hill newspapers. Duncan has also voiced public support for returning the gold standard.

In April 2016, Duncan endorsed Donald Trump for the Republican presidential nomination.

On 5 January 2017, he was one of only four Republicans to oppose the House's resolution 11 condemning the United Nations Security Council Resolution 2334.

Controversies
In February 2017, Duncan refused to hold any town halls in his district after the election of then recently inaugurated President Donald Trump. Duncan said that he preferred one-on-one meetings rather than town halls, adding that he was not willing to give a platform to "extremists, kooks and radicals."

Misuse of campaign funds
Duncan was accused of misuse of campaign funds for using them to pay his son almost $300,000 over the course of five years, for work not done or for fees that were too high. Duncan denied the charges.

However his son, John Duncan III (R) a Knox County Trustee, pled guilty to a felony charge of official misconduct for handing out bonuses to his own staff for training they had not received. Duncan III resigned from office and was given one year of probation. His charges are now expunged.

Retirement from Congress
On July 31, 2017, Duncan announced that he would not run for reelection in 2018, citing to spend more time with his family.

Committee assignments
 Committee on Transportation and Infrastructure (Vice Chairman)
 Subcommittee on Aviation (Former Chairman)
 Subcommittee on Highways and Transit (Former Chairman)
 Subcommittee on Railroads, Pipelines and Hazardous Materials
 United States House Committee on Oversight and Government Reform
 Subcommittee on Transportation and Public Assets
 Subcommittee on National Security

Caucus memberships
 Congressional Friends of Scotland Caucus (Founding Co-Chairman)
 Congressional Immigration Reform Caucus
 Liberty Caucus
United States Congressional International Conservation Caucus
 Sportsmen's Caucus
 Veterinary Medicine Caucus
Congressional Constitution Caucus
Congressional NextGen 9-1-1 Caucus
U.S.-Japan Caucus

Personal life
Duncan and his wife Lynn ( Hawkins) were married in 1978. They have four children, including former Knox County Trustee John Duncan III, and eight grandchildren. Lynn died in August 2021.

He is also the brother of Tennessee State Senator Becky Duncan Massey. After retiring from Congress, Duncan relocated from his home in Knoxville to Bean Station in neighboring Grainger County.

References

External links

 
 
 
 John Duncan articles at lewrockwell.com

1947 births
Living people
20th-century American politicians
20th-century Presbyterians
21st-century American politicians
21st-century Presbyterians
American nationalists
American Presbyterians
Critics of neoconservatism
George Washington University Law School alumni
The Great Atlantic & Pacific Tea Company
Non-interventionism
Paleoconservatism
People from Lebanon, Tennessee
Politicians from Knoxville, Tennessee
Presbyterians from Tennessee
Republican Party members of the United States House of Representatives from Tennessee
Right-wing populism in the United States
Sears Holdings people
Tennessee lawyers
Tennessee state court judges
University of Tennessee alumni